Saint Gwenhael (Old Breton: Gwenhael) was a Breton saint of the 6th century, born at Ergué-Gabéric (Finistère), the second abbot of Landévennec Abbey, successor in 532 to the founder, Saint Winwaloe (Gwenole). 
According to tradition, Winwaloe met Gwenaël in a street in Quimper when he was eleven, and was so convinced of his gifts that he at once obtained permission from Gwenaël's parents for him to study under his direction. The feast of Saint Gwenaël is 3 November. His Vita was written in the 9th century.

Background
Gwenaël is said to have restored several monasteries in Ireland, but his cult is mostly found in the west of Brittany, as can be established after some deciphering of the various forms his name has taken. The church of Ergué-Gabéric (Finistère) is dedicated to him, under the name of "Saint Guinal" (guuin = gwen), and this, together with its proximity to Quimper, has given rise to the suggestion that he may have been born there.

He is also said to have founded a monastery at Caudan (on the territory of the present Lanester), where there is a chapel of Saint Guénaël, and to have died there in about 590. His relics were translated to Corbeil.

The parish churches of Bolazec, Lescouët-Gouarec and Tréguidel are also dedicated to him.

The saint's name is composed of the Breton elements gwenn "white, fair; blessed" and hael "generous". 

According to Gwennole Le Menn, the saint's name is to be found in a number of placenames, including   Locunel in Caudan,   Saint-Guinel in Mauron,   Saint-Guénal and Saint-Vinnel in Poullaouen,   Lanvenaël in Plomeur,   Saint-Vénal and Saint-Guénal in Landivisiau and   Saint-Vénal in Saint-Pol-de-Léon. 
Kervénal also occurs three times, in Côtes-d'Armor, Finistère and Morbihan.

The surnames Guénal, Guénel, Trévinal and Kervennal doubtless have a connection with this saint's name, either directly or through a place name, such as the examples above.

References

Medieval Breton saints
6th-century Christian saints
6th-century Breton people